Kingsley Udoh (born December 7, 1990) is a Nigerian footballer who plays as a central defender for Sunshine Stars.

Club career
He began his career with the Global Crystal Academy before moving to Akwa United F.C. in winter 2007. In January 2009, Udoh would move to Spanish side Atlético Madrid, but was not signed by the Spanish team. In February 2009 Udoh attracted interest from Olympiacos F.C. and Olympique Lyon. On 14 January 2010 he began a trial with FC Hansa Rostock. He returned to the Nigerian league in February 2010 and signed with Heartland of Owerri

In 2012, he left Nigeria to train with Uruguayan team C.A. Peñarol but failed to sign a contract. After a reported move to Colombian club Llaneros F.C. fell through, he returned to Heartland in January 2013. In December 2013, he joined league rivals Kano Pillars.

International career
He recently won the U-17 African and World titles with where Nigeria defeated Spain on penalties.

Udoh was called into the Nigeria camp for the 2008 African Nations Cup but was cut from the final 23-man squad. He did however make his debut for the Super Eagles in the warm-up game with Sudan which Nigeria won 2-0. Nigeria's manager Berti Vogts cited his inclusion as a way of gaining valuable experience. He has also played for the under-20 and Olympic Eagles.

Titles

References

External links
 
 Kingsley Udoh - Talents - CM Revolution

Nigerian expatriate footballers
Akwa United F.C. players
Kano Pillars F.C. players
Sunshine Stars F.C. players
Nigerian footballers
1990 births
Living people
Heartland F.C. players
2011 CAF U-23 Championship players
Association football defenders
Nigeria international footballers